The Cathedral Church of Saint Michael and All Angels (formerly St. Michael's Parish Church),  is an Anglican church located on St. Michael's Row, two blocks east of National Heroes Square; at the centre of Bridgetown, Barbados. The Cathedral is the tallest of the Anglican (Church of England)'s houses of worship within Barbados.

History
Originally consecrated in 1665, and then rebuilt in 1789, it was elevated to Cathedral status in 1825 with the appointment of Bishop Coleridge to head the newly created Diocese of Barbados and the Leeward Islands.

The first parish church to be built was St. Michael's Parish Church, which was located where St. Mary's Anglican Church now stands. The original St. Michael's Parish Church was a small wooden church constructed between 1660 and 1665. Destroyed by a hurricane in 1780, the church was rebuilt nine years later. The church was later damaged in the great hurricane of 1831 but not destroyed. When the Diocese of Barbados was established, St. Michael's Parish Church became St. Michael's Cathedral, with Bishop William Hart Coleridge as its first bishop in 1825.

St. Michael Cathedral is made of coral stone with a beautiful tower and stunning stained glass windows. Inside the church is a marble baptismal font dating to the 17th century. The Chapel of the Blessed Sacrament was added in 1938 and features a roof covered in wallaba heartwood shingles and a Canterbury Cross on the northern wall.

In May 1980, to commemorate the 300th Anniversary of the Font, the organist and choirmaster of the Cathedral, Dr. John George Fletcher (D.Mus., F.R.C.O. (C.H.M.), A.D.C.M., F.T.C.L., L.R.A.M., A.R.C.M., L.R.S.M.) wrote the Anthem "Nipson Anomēmata (Wash My Sins)". The text is a Greek palindromic inscription (Νίψον ἀνομήματα, μὴ μόναν ὄψιν) which encircles the outer rim of the Font.

St. Michael's Cathedral continues to be used as a place of regular worship. In the 21st century, it is working to raise funds to restore the building.

Graveyard 

In the church's graveyard are the graves of two of Barbados' most outstanding public figures: Sir Grantley Adams (the first chief minister of Barbados and the first and only Prime Minister of the West Indies Federation) and that of his son, Tom Adams, the island's second Prime Minister. Also located there is the grave of William Brandford Griffith, former Governor of the Gold Coast colony of Africa.

Notes

References

Bishop of Barbados
Anglican Church of Barbados
Anglican Diocese of the Windward Islands
Church in the Province of the West Indies
List of historic buildings in Bridgetown and Saint Ann's Garrison

External links

The Cathedral Church of Saint Michael and All Angels profile, Emporis
St. Michael's Cathedral, TripAdvisor.com

Anglican cathedrals in the Caribbean
Buildings and structures in Bridgetown
Cathedrals in Barbados
Churches completed in 1789
1789 establishments in North America
1789 establishments in the British Empire